Big Timber Road is a commuter railroad station in the Kane County portion of Elgin, Illinois, a western suburb of Chicago. The station is the western terminus of Metra's Milwaukee District West Line. In Metra’s zone-based fare system, Big Timber Road is in zone H. As of 2018, Big Timber Road is the 75th busiest of Metra's 236 non-downtown stations, with an average of 699 weekday boardings. When it opened in 1986 (the same year the Milwaukee Road ceased operations), the surrounding area mostly consisted of farmland. Since then, numerous residential subdivisions have been built.

Big Timber Road presently does not have service on weekends or holidays. As of December 12, 2022, there are a total of 41 trains serving the station, with 19 inbound trains originating from here and 22 outbound trains terminating here on weekdays. Travel time to Union Station ranges from 1 hour and 7 minutes to 1 hour and 28 minutes, depending on the train.

References

External links

Chicago Railfan - Big Timber

Metra stations in Illinois
Railway stations in the United States opened in 1986
Elgin, Illinois
Transportation buildings and structures in Kane County, Illinois